Tales of the Unexpected (Roald Dahl's Tales of the Unexpected) is a British television series that aired between 1979 and 1988. Each episode told a story, often with sinister and wryly comedic undertones, with an unexpected twist ending. Every episode of series one, eight episodes of series two, and one episode of series three were based on short stories by Roald Dahl collected in the books Tales of the Unexpected, Kiss Kiss, and Someone Like You.

The series was made by Anglia Television for ITV with interior scenes recorded at their Norwich studios, whilst location filming mainly occurred across East Anglia. The theme music for the series was written by composer Ron Grainer. The dancer in all episodes was Karen Standley.

Format

The series originally adapted various stories from Roald Dahl's anthology books. Despite being produced on a low budget, the series attracted notable guest stars, including Susan George, Siân Phillips, José Ferrer, Joseph Cotten, Janet Leigh, John Gielgud, John Mills, Wendy Hiller, Denholm Elliott, Katy Jurado, Hilary Tindall, Joan Collins, Rod Taylor, Ian Holm, Brian Blessed, Siobhán McKenna, Brad Dourif, Michael Gambon, Cyril Cusack, Julie Harris, Michael Hordern, Derek Jacobi, Anna Neagle, Elaine Stritch, Andrew Ray, Harry H. Corbett, Zoë Wanamaker, Charles Dance, Michael Ontkean, Toyah Willcox and Timothy West.

Dahl introduced most of his own stories himself, giving short monologues explaining what inspired him to write them. Unlike other horror anthologies such as The Twilight Zone, Tales of the Unexpected features few supernatural, science-fiction, or fantasy elements and instead takes place in entirely realistic settings (exceptions include the series-one episode "William and Mary", the series-two episode "Royal Jelly", and the series-four episode "The Sound Machine").

Although many of Dahl's stories are left open to the reader's interpretation, the television series usually provided a generally accepted conclusion. This is exemplified in the story "The Landlady", the written version of which only hints at character Billy's fate, while the televised adaptation has a more resolved conclusion.

Later episodes were set in different locations outside the United Kingdom, with many being made in the United States of America.

Later series
The second series featured four episodes from other writers. The title reflected this change when it became Tales of the Unexpected – Introduced by Roald Dahl – Dahl ceased providing introductions for episodes after the programme had reached series three. The series-three episode "Parson's Pleasure" was the final regular episode to feature an on-screen introduction by Dahl, although he did return to provide introductions to the series-eight episodes "In the Cards" and "Nothing Short of Highway Robbery" and gave a brief voice-over introduction to the series-four episode "Shatterproof". The third and fourth series featured two episodes apiece adapted from Dahl stories, and a fifth, titled "The Surgeon", featured in the final series in 1988.

Way Out
Dahl had hosted a similar series for the American CBS network called Way Out in 1961. It was similar in concept and themes to The Twilight Zone, and ran for 14 episodes on Friday nights (as the lead-in for The Twilight Zone). It used some stories that would later be adapted for Tales of the Unexpected.

Episodes

References

External links

Intro to Tales of the Unexpected

Tales of the Unexpected Episode Guide

1970s British anthology television series
1970s British drama television series
1979 British television series debuts
1980s British anthology television series
1980s British drama television series
1988 British television series endings
English-language television shows
ITV television dramas
Television series by ITV Studios
Television shows produced by Anglia Television